Sullivan Heights is a neighbourhood in Burnaby, just north of Lougheed highway, east of Government road and south of SFU (Simon Fraser University) campus. Bordering the city of Coquitlam and Port Moody, the area is served by the newly operational Millennium Line that connects the city of Coquitlam to other parts of greater Vancouver.

Amenities 
The neighbourhood's collection of restaurants, cafes and boutique eateries fosters residents to stay near home, but if they do want to hop onto Vancouver's west, the downtown district and other parts of greater Vancouver are conveniently connected with two prominent SkyTrain stations, Lougheed Centre and Burquitlam.

North Road, a dividing road between Coquitlam and Burnaby, forms the eastern border of Sullivan Heights making it the boundary region of Burnaby with West Coquitlam, an area more colloquially referred to as Burquitlam.

Schools
 Stoney Creek Community School (K–7)
 Lyndhurst Elementary (K–7)
 Cameron Elementary (K–7) 
 Burnaby Mountain Secondary (8–12)

References

External links 
 
 
 
 

Populated places in Greater Vancouver
Neighbourhoods in Burnaby